Autoline Detroit is a weekly television show about the global automotive industry.

Extra contents that did not fit into the television broadcast are also found in the shows web site.

Autoline in LA
It is a special series produced by Blue Sky Productions Inc. where John McElroy explores the automobile industry in Los Angeles. The series covers shows 1218–1228. The end of this series also ended Autoline Detroit's broadcast on SPEED.

Autoline on Autoblog with John McElroy
John McElroy also posted articles in Autoblog under the Autoline name.

Autoline After Hours
McElroy currently hosts a weekly live online and uncensored forum every Thursday night with Gary Vasilash, and various guest commentators.

RoundAbout Show
The RoundAbout Show was a weekly podcast affiliated with Autoline Detroit. It was hosted and recorded in the Livonia, Michigan studio. This podcast used to put a quirky twist on all automotive news and features unique segments such as the "Blind Spot story of the week" and "RoundAbout Rearview."
The last episode (number 145, title "This Was RoundAbout") aired October 9, 2012.

OpenLine
OpenLine is a monthly call-in show hosted by Michelle Naranjo and Chelsea Sexton who lead discussions about current automotive news.

References

External links
Autoline home page
Blue Sky Productions page
Speed channel page
Autoline on Autoblog

Automotive television series
Motorsport mass media in the United States